Taphrotopium is a genus of beetles belonging to the family Apionidae.

The species of this genus are found in Europe.

Species:
 Taphrotopium steveni (Gyllenhal, 1839) 
 Taphrotopium sulcifrons (Herbst, 1797)

References

Brentidae